Fırat Suçsuz (born 27 June 1996) is a professional footballer who plays as a left-back or left winger for Viktoria Berlin. Born in Germany, he has represented Turkey at youth level.

Career
In January 2019, Suçsuz agreed the termination of his contract with 3. Liga side Carl Zeiss Jena. On 14 January, he then joined Fatih Karagümrük in the Turkish TFF Second League.

References

External links
 Profile at DFB.de
 Profile at kicker.de
 

1996 births
Living people
German people of Turkish descent
Footballers from Berlin
Turkish footballers
German footballers
Association football defenders
Turkey youth international footballers
RB Leipzig II players
VfR Aalen players
FC Carl Zeiss Jena players
Fatih Karagümrük S.K. footballers
FC Viktoria 1889 Berlin players
3. Liga players
TFF Second League players
Regionalliga players